Münchener Freiheit may refer to:

 Münchener Freiheit (band), a German pop and rock band
 Münchner Freiheit, a square in Munich, Germany, called Münchener Freiheit until 1998
 Münchner Freiheit (Munich U-Bahn), a station
Münchener Freiheit (TV series), a 1985 German TV series